Krzywin may refer to the following places in Poland:
Krzywiń, a town in west-central Poland
Krzywin, Choszczno County
Krzywin, Gryfino County